Kyle Janek (born January 10, 1958) is an American physician and former Republican member of the Texas Senate, having represented District 17 from November 2002 until June 2, 2008. The district includes portions of Harris, Brazoria, Fort Bend, Galveston, and Jefferson counties. Janek was not a candidate for renomination to the state Senate in the Republican primary held on March 4.

Janek resigned the seat, and Governor Rick Perry called a special election to coincide with the regular November 4 general election to fill the two years remaining in the term. Republican Joan Huffman, a former felony court judge from Houston and Democrat Chris Bell, a former U.S. representative who was Perry's 2006 election opponent, led the field and went into a December 16 runoff. Huffman ultimately prevailed, 56-44 percent. She becomes the sixth woman serving in the state Senate.

Biography

An anesthesiologist by training, Janek has served in the Texas Legislature as a Republican since 1994. He received an M.D. from the University of Texas Medical Branch in Galveston in 1983 and has since practiced medicine. Janek is the son of former Galveston County Commissioner Eddie Janek Sr. He is the brother of Galveston politician Eddie Janek Jr., who has previously sought county office.

In 1992 Janek entered the Republican primary for Texas State Representative District 134 against two opponents, Mike Shelby and Tim Turner. Janek prevailed against Shelby, later a U.S. Attorney, in the runoff, but he lost the general election to Democrat Sue Schechter, even though the District was almost 60 percent Republican. In 1994, when Schechter chose not to seek re-election, Janek was elected. He served in the Texas House of Representatives until 2002, when he ran for the Texas Senate. Janek sought the seat being vacated by longtime District 17 Senator J. E. "Buster" Brown. Janek defeated attorney Gary M. Polland in the Republican primary, and then prevailed against Democratic candidate Ronnie Ellen Harrison in the general election. He was reelected again in 2006 over a Libertarian Party opponent.

Since being elected to the Senate, Janek has focused his legislative efforts on property tax reform, and the sponsorship of a state program to prevent steroid abuse among high school athletes.

On September 1, 2012, Janek began serving as the Executive Commissioner to the Texas Health and Human Services Commission.

2008 election

Janek resigned his Senate seat in June 2008. Joan Huffman won the subsequent special election to replace Janek.

Election history

Most recent election

2006

Previous elections

2002

2000

1998

1996

1994

1992

References

External links
Senate of Texas - Senator Kyle Janek official TX Senate website
Project Vote Smart - Senator Kyle Janek (TX) profile
Follow the Money - Kyle Janek
2006 2004 2002 2000 1998 campaign contributions

1958 births
Living people
Republican Party Texas state senators
Republican Party members of the Texas House of Representatives
People from Houston
American anesthesiologists
People from Galveston, Texas
American politicians of Polish descent
21st-century American politicians